Heavenly Recordings is a London-based independent record label founded by Jeff Barrett in 1990. Heavenly released the first albums from Saint Etienne, Beth Orton and Doves, and early singles by Manic Street Preachers. Current Heavenly artists include Stealing Sheep, Mattiel, The Orielles, Confidence Man, audiobooks, Pip Blom, H. Hawkline, King Gizzard & the Lizard Wizard, Gwenno Saunders, Amber Arcades, Working Men's Club, Katy J Pearson and CHAI.

Heavenly won Independent Label of the Year at the 2015 Music Week Awards. Other achievements include a Mercury Prize nomination for Saint Etienne's debut album Foxbase Alpha and three Number 1 albums with Doves. It is considered a key British indie record label, alongside Factory, Creation, Rough Trade, Mute, Ninja Tune and Domino.

History

1980s: pre-Heavenly

In the early 1980s, Jeff Barrett was a record shop manager and live music promoter living in Plymouth. He put on early gigs by The Jesus and Mary Chain, Primal Scream, The Loft and The Pastels, all bands signed to Creation Records, and Creation founder Alan McGee soon offered Barrett a job at the label. Jeff became Creation’s first full-time employee, in the summer of 1985, and worked there until 1988, when he left to set up Capersville press agency. Capersville represented several Creation bands, as well as representing Factory Records and all their artists (including Happy Mondays and New Order), The KLF and Inspiral Carpets. At the same time, Barrett was putting on gigs and club nights in London and set up two short-lived record labels – Head and Sub-Aqua – who released records by Loop, East Village and Laugh. Then in 1990, in partnership with his former record shop boss Mike Chadwick, Barrett set up Heavenly.

1990s & 2000s

The first Heavenly release was a 12-inch single by London house act Sly & Lovechild, produced by Andrew Weatherall. This was followed by the debut singles from Saint Etienne ("Only Love Can Break Your Heart") and Flowered Up ("It’s On"); both became key tracks in the UK house scene.

Next, Heavenly signed Manic Street Preachers and released two singles, "Motown Junk" in January 1991 and "You Love Us" in May 1991. The Manics then signed to Columbia Records for their first album.

Meanwhile, Flowered Up had made one album with London Records but returned to Heavenly in 1992 for their classic 13-minute single, "Weekender." Saint Etienne’s debut album, Foxbase Alpha, was shortlisted for the 1992 Mercury Prize.

Over the next few years, Heavenly signed and released records by The Rockingbirds, Flowered Up, Beth Orton, The Hybirds, Monkey Mafia, Dot Allison, Q-Tee and Espiritu. Colleague and friend Martin Kelly became a partner in the label, as well as manager of Saint Etienne. Beth Orton's first album Trailer Park was nominated for two Brit Awards and for the 1997 Mercury Prize. Orton won a Brit for her second album, Central Reservation, in 2000.

In 2000 Heavenly signed Doves, as well as 22-20s, Cherry Ghost, Edwyn Collins and Ed Harcourt. Doves had four platinum albums in a row: Lost Souls (2000), The Last Broadcast (2002), Some Cities (2005), and Kingdom of Rust (2009). The Last Broadcast and Some Cities gave Heavenly its first UK Number 1 albums.

In 2004 the label signed The Magic Numbers, whose self-titled debut became Heavenly’s bestselling album ever. The album was Mercury-nominated in 2005, and band were nominated for Best British Newcomer at the 2006 Brit Awards.

2010s

Heavenly signed Stealing Sheep and Toy in 2011; both bands released their debuts the following year. This marked the start of another halcyon period for Heavenly.

In 2012 the label released the debut single from Temples, "Shelter Song." In 2013, they signed Mark Lanegan and Duke Garwood for their collaborative album Black Pudding; both artists are now signed to Heavenly individually. Temples’ debut album Sun Structures, released in 2014, was Heavenly’s 100th album release, a UK Top 10 hit and Rough Trade’s Number 1 Album of the Year.

In 2014 and 2015, in the run-up to their 25th anniversary, the label signed and released albums by The Wytches, Gwenno, Eaves, Drinks, H. Hawkline, Hooton Tennis Club, Kid Wave, King Gizzard & the Lizard Wizard and Fever The Ghost.

In April 2015, Jeff Barrett and Heavenly right-hand man Danny Mitchell accepted the Music Week Awards prize for Best Independent Record Company.

In 2017, King Gizzard & the Lizard Wizard released five critically acclaimed full-length albums, all on Heavenly. Pitchfork described the releases as “musically and ideologically dense albums […] showing a new dedication to pop craftsmanship.” The Quietus said that each album “offered up something radical and conceptually full-blown. Much better still, they all delivered on quality.”

In 2016, the label released Fading Lines by Dutch singer Amber Arcades. Since then, Heavenly releases include: Baxter Dury’s Prince of Tears, described by The Quietus as “beautiful, heart-rending, sexy, repulsive”; Gwenno’s second album, Le Kov, sung entirely in Cornish and made Album of the Year lists in The Guardian, Mojo and Rough Trade; the debut album from David Wrench’s new band audiobooks; Stealing Sheep’s “bold, voltaic” third album, Big Wows; and Pip Blom’s debut, Boat.

In 2019 Heavenly signed Working Men’s Club, Katy J Pearson and Raf Rundell.

Affiliations

The Social

In 1999 The Social opened in central London near Oxford Circus, named for the Sunday Social nights which Heavenly ran with The Chemical Brothers during the 90s. The Social is still an independent live venue currently preparing to celebrate its 30th year after fighting off threat of a buyout in 2019. Audiobooks, Black Midi, Goat Girl, Edwyn Collins, The Chemical Brothers and Beck have played at The Social in the past couple of years, and it hosts regular literary readings, often in cahoots with Faber – recent authors include Eimear McBride, Viv Albertine, Deborah Levy, DBC Pierre and Robert Macfarlane. The Social also runs the Stonebridge Bar at Glastonbury Festival.

Caught by the River

In 2007, Barrett set up Caught By The River with Robin Turner and Andrew Walsh. CBTR commissions writers with a focus on the natural world and our relationships with it, and is currently run by Diva Harris. It has supported several new authors in the early stages of their careers, including Amy Liptrot and Luke Turner of The Quietus, who both wrote regular columns for Caught By The River that later became critically acclaimed books. CBTR also releases music on the Rivertones label and hosts stages at UK festivals including Port Eliot and Cerys Matthews' The Good Life Experience.

Heavenly Films

In 2009 Martin Kelly left Heavenly Recordings and set up Heavenly Films with his brother, Paul Kelly. Their films include Lawrence of Belgravia (2011), about Lawrence from indie band Felt, and Dexys: Nowhere Is Home (2014).

Artists

Current
 Amber Arcades
 audiobooks
 Baxter Dury
Boy Azooga
 Chai
 Confidence Man
 Duke Garwood
 Gwenno
 H. Hawkline
 Hatchie
 Jimi Goodwin
 Katy J. Pearson
 King Gizzard and The Lizard Wizard
 Mark Lanegan
 Mattiel
 Night Beats 
 The Orielles
 The Parrots
 Pip Blom
 Saint Etienne
 Gwenno Saunders
 Stealing Sheep
 Working Men's Club

Former

 22-20s
 Beggars
 Bronx Dogs
 Cherry Ghost
 Dr. Robert
 Dot Allison
 Doves
 DRINKS
 East Village
 Eaves
 Edwyn Collins
 Fever The Ghost
 Espiritu
 Fabulous
 Fionn Regan
 Flowered Up
 Pete Fowler
 Pete Greenwood
 Hooton Tennis Club
 James Levy and the Blood Red Rose
 Jaymay
 Ed Harcourt
 The Hybirds
 Kid Wave
 LCMDF
 The Magic Numbers
 Manic Street Preachers
 Monkey Mafia
 Trevor Moss & Hannah-Lou
 Nada Surf
 Northern Uproar
 Omega Amoeba
 Beth Orton
 Q-Tee
 The Head and the Heart
 The Soft Pack
 The Little Ones
 The Loose Salute
 The Rockingbirds
 Sea of Bees
 Sly and Lovechild
 Temples
 The Wytches
 Toy
 The Voyeurs
 James Walbourne
 The Vines
 The Wishing Stones

See also
 List of record labels
 Heavenly Records discography

References

External links
 – official site

A Slice Of Heaven: 25 Years Of Heavenly Recordings  - [PIAS]'s Blog, 24 February 2015

British independent record labels
Record labels established in 1990
Indie rock record labels